The Wisconsin Badgers represented the University of Wisconsin in WCHA women's ice hockey during the 2016-17 NCAA Division I women's ice hockey season. The Badgers appeared in the NCAA Championship Game, losing to the Clarkson Golden Knights 0-3.

Offseason

Recruiting

Roster

2016–17 Badgers

Regular season

News and notes
On Sunday, November 6, 2016, Ann-Renee Desbiens broke Noora Raty’s for most NCAA career shutout records. In a 6-0 shutout victory against the Bemidji State Beavers, Desbiens would log career shutout number 44.

2016-17 Schedule

|-
!colspan=12 style="background:red;color:#FFFFFF;"| Regular Season

|-
!colspan=12 style="background:red;color:#FFFFFF;"| WCHA Tournament

|-
!colspan=12 style="background:red;color:#FFFFFF;"| NCAA Tournament

Awards and honors
Emily Clark, WCHA Player of the Month (December 2016)

Ann-Renee Desbiens, WCHA Offensive Player of the Month, January 2017

Ann-Renée Desbiens, WCHA Defensive Player of the Week (Week of February 14, 2017)  

 Alexis Mauermann, WCHA Rookie of the Week (Week of January 31, 2017)

Abby Roque, WCHA Rookie of the Week (Week of February 7, 2017)

Abby Roque, WCHA Rookie of the Week (Week of February 14, 2017)  

Baylee Wellhausen, WCHA Offensive Player of the Week (Week of February 14, 2017) 

Ann-Renée Desbiens - 2017 Patty Kazmaier Award recipient

Ann-Renée Desbiens - WCHA Goaltending Champion

Abby Roque, Forward - WCHA Rookie of the Year

Ann-Renée Desbiens, Goaltender - All-WCHA First Team

Annie Pankowski, Forward - All-WCHA First Team

Jenny Ryan, Defense - All-WCHA First Team

Sarah Nurse, Forward - All-WCHA Second Team

Emily Clark, Forward - All-WCHA Third Team

Abby Roque, Forward - All-WCHA Rookie Team

Mekenzie Steffan, Defense - All-WCHA Rookie Team

All-America honors
Sarah Nurse, Second-Team All-American (2016-17)

Annie Pankowski, Second-Team All-American (2016-17)

Jenny Ryan, Second-Team All-American (2016-17)

References

Wisconsin
Wisconsin Badgers women's ice hockey seasons
Wisconsin
Wiscon
Wiscon